Aleurodiscus lividocoeruleus is a species of fungus belonging to the family Stereaceae.

It is native to Europe and Northern America.

Synonyms:
 Acanthophysellum lividocoeruleum (P.Karst.) Parmasto

References

Stereaceae